Chrostowo may refer to the following places in Poland:
Chrostowo, Masovian Voivodeship
Chrostowo, Podlaskie Voivodeship
Chróstowo, Kuyavian-Pomeranian Voivodeship
Chróstowo, Pomeranian Voivodeship
Chróstowo, West Pomeranian Voivodeship